Losing may refer to:

Music
 "Losing" (Tenth Avenue North song), a 2012 song by Tenth Avenue North
 "Losing" (Takida song), a 2006 song by Takida
 Losing (album)

People with the surname
 Sabine Lösing (born 1955), German politician

See also
 Lose (disambiguation)
 Loss (disambiguation)